Coronel Horácio de Mattos Airport  is the airport serving Lençóis and Chapada Diamantina National Park, Brazil, located in the adjoining municipality of Coronel Octaviano Alves. It is named after Horácio Queiróz de Mattos (1882-1931), a politician who fought against the Prestes Insurrection between 1925 and 1927.

Airlines and destinations

Access

See also

List of airports in Brazil

References

External links

Airports in Bahia